Bentpath is a small village between Eskdalemuir and Langholm in Dumfries and Galloway, Scotland. It is located on the River Esk and has a church and a library.  Westerkirk library was founded in 1791 and is the oldest library in Scotland which is still in use.

References

Villages in Dumfries and Galloway